The Ludwik Fleck Prize is an annual award given for a book in the field of science and technology studies. It was created by the 4S Council (Society for the Social Studies of Science) in 1992 and is named after microbiologist Ludwik Fleck.

Prize Winners

See also

 List of social sciences awards

References
 

Social sciences awards
Science writing awards
Science and technology studies
Awards established in 1992
American literary awards